Superpickers is a 1974 album by guitarist Chet Atkins and top recording session players in Nashville, TN.

"Fiddlin' Around" reached No. 75 on the Billboard Country Singles chart.

Reception

Writing for Allmusic, critic William Ruhlmann wrote of the album "Atkins joins together with an A-list of Nashville session musicians for a set of picking extravaganzas... Atkins himself is goaded into some wonderful playing as a result, and Superpickers is one of his best albums."

Reissues
 Superpickers was reissued on CD in 1998 along with Picks on the Hits by One Way Records.

Track listing

Side one
 "Paramaribo" (John D. Loudermilk) – 2:27
 "Fiddlin' Around" (Johnny Gimble) – 3:06
 "Mr. Bojangles" (Jerry Jeff Walker) – 4:35
 "Beef and Biscuits" (Mat Camison) – 2:35
 "Sweet Dreams" (Don Gibson) – 2:44

Side two
 "Just Another Rag" (Atkins, Jerry Reed Hubbard) – 2:38
 "Canadian Pacific" (Ray Griff) – 3:50
 "City of New Orleans" (Steve Goodman) – 3:26
 "Bells of Saint Mary's" (Doug Tringer) – 2:51
 "Are You from Dixie ('Cause I'm from Dixie Too)" (George L. Cobb, Jack Yellen) – 3:02

Personnel
Chet Atkins - guitar
Johnny Gimble - fiddle
Buddy Spicher - fiddle
Buddy Harman - drums
Charlie McCoy - harmonica
 Weldon Myrick  - pedal steel guitar
Jerry Shook - guitar
Farrell Morris – percussion
Hargus "Pig" Robbins - piano
Larrie Londin - drums
Paul Yandell - guitar, ukulele
Henry Strzelecki -bass
Bobby Thompson - banjo, guitar

See also
The Nashville A-Team

References

Chet Atkins albums
1974 albums
Albums produced by Chet Atkins
Albums produced by Bob Ferguson (music)
RCA Records albums